The Forces Children's Trust is a British charity devoted to helping dependent children that have lost a parent whilst serving with the Armed Forces.

The Trust was founded and chaired by Denny Wise motivated by his belief that ‘To help a child is an honour'.

On 7 November 2009, the Axholme Connexion held a Remembrance Concert at St Oswald's Church in Crowle, Lincolnshire, England, which raised funds for the Forces Children's Trust and Help For Heroes.

Trustees
Mr. Denny Wise,
Mr. Jeremy Webb,

Patrons
Mr. Chris Grayling MP,
Mr. Simon Weston OBE

Ambassador
The Earl of Arundel

References

External links
"The Forces Children's Trust"

Children's charities based in the United Kingdom